The 2019 Panda Cup was the sixth edition of the international youth association football competition.

The tournament was hosted in Chengdu between 25 and 29 May 2019, and was include an international youth football development forum as part of the event. Previously held as an under-19 event, Chengdu Football Association announced that the 2019 edition would be an under-18 event.

South Korea finished top of the standings for the tournament but were later stripped of the title following prizegiving celebrations which were considered offensive and disrespectful to both the tournament hosts and the Chinese people.

Participating teams
In May 2018, it was announced that hosts China had invited South Korea, New Zealand and Thailand to participate in the 2019 Panda Cup.
Thailand opted to name an U-18 side in preparation for the 2019 AFF Under-18 Cup., as did China and South Korea, while New Zealand elected to send their U17 side in preparation for the 2019 FIFA U-17 World Cup later in the year,

Venues

Matches

All times are China Standard Time (UTC+08:00)

Goalscorers
3 goals 
 Hwang Jae-hwan

2 goals
 Achitpol Keereerom

1 goal

 Heo Yool
 Cho Hyun-taek
 Kim Geon-oh
 Lee Jin-yong
 Kwon Hyeok-kyu
 An Jae-jun 
 Anatcha Thepsiri
 Sitthinan Rungrueang
 Jesse Randall
 Matthew Garbett

Controversies
Following the completion of the competition, the South Korea team was criticised for disrespecting the trophy. A South Korean player was seen to place the trophy on the ground and place his foot on it. The Panda Cup organising committee issued a formal statement on the issue and demanded an apology from the players and the South Korean representatives.
South Korea were subsequently stripped of the title despite the apology.

References

External links
 

Anti-South Korean sentiment in China
International association football competitions hosted by China
2019 in association football
Sport in Chengdu
2019 in Chinese football
Panda Cup